Ubayd Allah ibn Jahsh was one of the four hanifs (a type of monotheists) mentioned by Ibn Ishaq, the others being Waraka ibn Nawfal, Uthman ibn Huwairith and Zayd ibn Amr.

Biography

He was the son of Jahsh ibn Riyab and Umayma bint Abd al-Muttalib, hence a brother of Abd Allah ibn Jahsh, Zaynab bint Jahsh, Abu Ahmad ibn Jahsh, Habiba bint Jahsh and Hammanah bint Jahsh, a first cousin of Islamic prophet Muhammad and Ali, and a nephew of Hamza ibn ‘Abd al-Muttalib. He married Ramla bint Abi Sufyan (who was also known as Umm Habiba), and they had one daughter, Habibah bint Ubayd Allah.

He and his wife became Muslims and, in order to escape from the Meccan persecution, they emigrated to Abyssinia. At Axum, part of the Aksumite Empire, the Christian king Aṣḥama ibn Abjar (also known as Najashi) gave sanctuary to the Muslims. There Ubayd Allah eventually converted to Christianity and testified his new faith to the other Muslim refugees. Ibn Ishaq relates: 

Due to his conversion, he separated from his wife. He eventually died in Abyssinia in 627.

Later on Muhammad married his widow, Ramlah. Muhammad also married Ubayd Allah's sister Zaynab earlier.

See also
Obaidullah (disambiguation)
Jahsh (name)

References

Converts to Oriental Orthodoxy from Islam
Arab Christians
7th-century deaths
7th-century Arabs
Year of birth unknown
Former Muslims